Fantasy is the third studio album by Canadian indie-rock duo Lightning Dust. It was released in June 2013 under Jagjaguwar Records.

Lightning Dust released the music video for their first single "Diamond" in May 2013

Track list

References

2013 albums
Jagjaguwar albums
Lightning Dust albums